The Battle of Cao Ba Lanh (also known as the Battle of Hill 1050) was part of the Battle of Móng Cái, fought during the Sino-Vietnamese War between February and March 1979 near the city of Móng Cái and other districts of Quảng Ninh Province that bordered the People's Republic of China. The battle broke out as Chinese People's Liberation Army (PLA) units launched diversionary attacks in support of the Chinese invasion in the major fronts of Lạng Sơn, Cao Bằng and Lào Cai. A Chinese regiment clashed with a Vietnamese platoon, taking heavy casualties to seize the strategic peak which was later recaptured by reinforcements.

Background 
Cao Ba Lanh (Hill 1050) was a strategic peak located near the Sino-Vietnamese border. Overlooking the border crossing at Hoành Mô, the side which controlled it could restrict their enemy's use of that crossing. In addition, the only major road connection to Mong Cai was National Highway 4B, located near Binh Lieu. Capturing it would have cut supply lines to Mong Cai and isolated it since all reinforcement and resupply would have to be delivered by sea.

Battle 
On 16–17 February, the People's Liberation Army troops attacked multiple areas in Quảng Ninh, including the Hoành Mô area. Expecting an attack, the small Vietnamese platoon assigned to defend Cao Ba Lanh had placed mines and booby traps along the most likely venues of approach, before spreading itself out to maximize its field of fire. The platoon belonged to the 325th Division, and numbered around 20 men according to veteran Nguyen Duc Hop.

On the first day of fighting, the Chinese attacked with two platoons but were repulsed. They attacked again with a company of men, but were pushed back with 15 casualties. On the following day, two battalions attacked the reinforced position but retreated after losing 47 men to gunfire and booby traps. Following this, three battalions (a full regiment) attacked the hill twice after multiple heavy artillery bombardments. After five hours of fighting, the 2800-man force eventually seized the hill, losing 360 casualties in the process. The high losses were the result of well-equipped, entrenched defenders as well as poor tactics, with human wave assaults having been repeatedly used against the PAVN

Aftermath 
The battle exposed inadequacies in the PLA's military abilities, with a regiment having been held up by a platoon. Other battles in Quang Ninh were similarly unsuccessful, and the Vietnamese later recaptured all territories in the province. When China later declared victory in Vietnam, it mentioned every town where its forces had fought with success - no mention being made of towns in Quang Ninh.

Chinese forces lost a total of around 422 casualties in the fights for the mountain, with 360 being lost in the regimental-sized attacks. The Vietnamese claimed to have inflicted 750 casualties on the Chinese during the battle of Cao Ba Lanh and nearby Hill 781. Hanoi Radio placed a higher figure of 700 Chinese casualties at Cao Ba Lanh, claiming to have "trounced three battalions and wiped out 700 Chinese aggressors". Casualties for the entrenched Vietnamese defenders were unclear, although Nguyen Duc Hop said he witnessed two men killed before he himself was wounded and passed out.

Further fighting took place near the hill, with the PAVN later sending in the 288th Regiment to recapture it on 19 February. The men of the original platoon were feted for their heroics, such as Hop, who was promoted by two ranks from private (2nd class) to corporal.

Notes

References

Bibliography 
 O'Dowd, Edward C. (2007). Chinese Military Strategy in the Third Indochina War: The Last Maoist War. New York: Routledge. 

Sino-Vietnamese War
Military history of Vietnam
Battles involving Vietnam
History of Quảng Ninh Province
1979 in Vietnam
Battles involving China